Socrates Orel Brito (born September 6, 1992) is a Dominican professional baseball outfielder for the Kia Tigers of the KBO League (KBO). He has played in Major League Baseball (MLB) for the Arizona Diamondbacks and Toronto Blue Jays.

Career

Arizona Diamondbacks

Brito was signed by the Arizona Diamondbacks in 2010 out of the Dominican Republic. He was added to their 40-man roster on November 20, 2014, after he batted .293 with 38 stolen bases for the Visalia Rawhide of the Class A-Advanced California League. Brito began the 2015 season with the Mobile BayBears of the Class AA Southern League. Brito was chosen to represent the Diamondbacks at the 2015 All-Star Futures Game.  He made his MLB debut on September 8, 2015. Brito was named the Diamondbacks' Minor League Player of the Year for 2015.

Brito competed with Yasmany Tomas for playing time in 2016,  but broke a big toe in June 2016. He injured his hamate bone while playing in winter baseball after the season, and had surgery to repair a dislocated finger on his right hand in the spring in 2017. He again injured a finger during winter baseball after the 2017 season. In 2018, in 40 at bats he hit .196/.358/.554 with two stolen bases. He had the fastest baserunning sprint speed of all major league right fielders, at 29.9 feet/second. Playing for the Reno Aces of the Class AAA Pacific Coast League, he was selected for the Triple-A All-Star Game.

Toronto Blue Jays
The San Diego Padres claimed Brito off of waivers on March 27, 2019. Brito was designated for assignment on March 30, following the promotion of Nick Margevicius.

On April 2, 2019, Brito was traded to the Toronto Blue Jays in exchange for Rodrigo Orozco. Brito was called up by the Blue Jays on April 4. He was designated for assignment on May 10 after an abysmal start to the season in which he batted .077. Brito spent the rest of the season in AAA with the Buffalo Bisons, hitting .282/.328/.510 with 16 home runs, and was named the Bisons MVP for 2019.  In 2019 in the major leagues, he again had the fastest sprint speed of all major league right fielders, at 29.8 feet/second. He became a free agent following the 2019 season.

Pittsburgh Pirates
On December 17, 2019, Brito signed a minor league contract with the Pittsburgh Pirates. On July 5, 2020, it was announced that Brito had tested positive for COVID-19. Brito opted out of the 2020 season on September 1, 2020, after his brother died from COVID-19. He became a free agent on November 2, 2020.

New York Yankees
On January 1, 2021, Brito signed a minor league contract with the New York Yankees organization. Brito spent the 2021 season with the Triple-A Scranton/Wilkes-Barre Railriders. He played in 107 games, hitting .251 with 9 home runs and 53 RBI's. Brito became a free agent.

Kia Tigers
On December 26, 2021, Brito signed with the Kia Tigers of the KBO League. On November 9, 2022, Brito re-signed a one-year contract for the 2023 season worth $1.1 million.

Personal life
Brito is a second cousin to fellow major leaguer Franchy Cordero.

References

External links

1992 births
Living people
Arizona Diamondbacks players
Arizona League Diamondbacks players
Buffalo Bisons (minor league) players
Dominican Republic expatriate baseball players in Canada
Dominican Republic expatriate baseball players in the United States
Dominican Summer League Diamondbacks players
Estrellas Orientales players
Major League Baseball outfielders
Major League Baseball players from the Dominican Republic
Missoula Osprey players
Mobile BayBears players
Scranton/Wilkes-Barre RailRiders players
South Bend Silver Hawks players
Toronto Blue Jays players
Visalia Rawhide players
People from Azua Province